Frans Körver (born 31 July 1937) is a Dutch former professional football player and manager.

Career
During the 1980s and 1990s, Körver guided five Dutch league teams to six promotions from the Eerste Divisie to the Eredivisie - FC Wageningen, Fortuna Sittard, MVV Maastricht (twice), VVV-Venlo and De Graafschap.

Personal life
He was born in Schinnen.

Honours
MVV
 UEFA Intertoto Cup: 1970

References

1937 births
Living people
People from Schinnen
Dutch footballers
Footballers from Limburg (Netherlands)
Association football goalkeepers
MVV Maastricht players
Fortuna Sittard players
Dutch football managers
Roda JC Kerkrade managers
FC Wageningen managers
MVV Maastricht managers
FC Dordrecht managers
VVV-Venlo managers
Helmond Sport managers
De Graafschap managers